The Logan–Magnolia Community School District is a rural public school district headquartered in Logan, Iowa.

The district is completely within Harrison County, and serves Logan, Magnolia, and the surrounding rural areas.

The school mascot is the Panther and the colors are purple and gold.

Schools
The district operates two schools, located in a single facility in Logan:
Logan–Magnolia Elementary School
Logan–Magnolia Jr./Sr. High School

Logan–Magnolia High School

Athletics
The Panthers compete in the Western Iowa Conference in the following sports:
Cross country
 Girls Class 1A State Champions (2018, 2019)
 Girls Class 1A State Runner-up (2021)
Volleyball
Football
2-time class A state champions (1990, 2014)
Basketball
Wrestling
 2-time class 1A state champions (2005, 2011)
 2-time class 1A state duals champions (2003, 2011) 
Track and field
 Girls' 2-time class 2A state champions (2009, 2011)
Golf
Soccer
Baseball
Softball
 Class 1A State Runner-Up (2015)

Fight song
Logan-Magnolia High uses the same fight song as the University of Illinois at Urbana-Champaign with minor word changes.

See also
List of school districts in Iowa
List of high schools in Iowa

References

External links
 Logan–Magnolia Community School District

School districts in Iowa
Education in Harrison County, Iowa